Hedley is a masculine given name which may refer to:

People:
 Hedley Atkins (1905–1983), British professor of surgery and President of the Royal College of Surgeons
 Hedley Blackmore (1901-1992), Australian rules footballer
 Hedley Francis Gregory Bridges (1902–1947), Canadian politician
 Hedley Burrows (1887-1983), Anglican cleric, Dean of Hereford
 Hedley Donovan (1914-1990), editor-in-chief of Time, Inc.
 Hedley David Farquhar (politician) (1927–2009), Australian politician
 Hedley Fitton (1859-1929), English engraver and printmaker
 Hedley Hazelden (1915-2001), British civilian test pilot and Second World War RAF squadron leader
 Hedley Hope-Nicholson (1888–1969), English barrister and littérateur
 Hedley Howarth (1943-2008), New Zealand international cricketer
 Hedley Kett (1913-2014), British Second World War submarine commander
 Hedley Marston (1900-1965), Australian biochemist
 Hedley Vicars Short, Canadian Anglican Bishop of Saskatchewan (1970-1985)
 Hedley Thomas, Australian investigative journalist and author
 Hedley Verity (1905-1943), English cricketer
 Hedley Webster (1880–1954), Irish Anglican Bishop of Killaloe, Kilfenora, Clonfert and Kilmacduagh
 Hedley Woodhouse (1920-1984), Canadian jockey

Fictional characters
 Hedley Lamarr, villain of the film Blazing Saddles

Masculine given names